Davidgallowaya is a genus of lichenized fungi in the family Parmeliaceae. The genus is monotypic, containing the single corticolous species Davidgallowaya cornutispora, found in Papua New Guinea. Davidgallowaya was circumscribed by Dutch lichenologist André Aptroot in 2007. The genus name honours David Galloway (1942–2014).

See also
List of Parmeliaceae genera

References

Parmeliaceae
Lichen genera
Monotypic Lecanorales genera
Taxa described in 2007
Taxa named by André Aptroot